Lushan Geopark, is  located in the region around Mount Lu, Jiujiang. The protected area of  extends from the Yangtze River to the Poyang Lake basin.

Landmarks
Natural landmarks
The park area features the effects of Quaternary glaciation, and exceptional geological upthrown fault scarps from the Quaternary age.

The resulting stunning landscapes include: Lu'shan—Mount Lu, other mountains and summit peaks, valleys, gorges, gullies, rock formations, natural caves, and waterfalls.
  
Cultural landmarks
The area also contains large numbers of Taoist and Buddhist temples, as well as several landmarks of Confucianism.

Conservation
In 1996, Mount Lu became an UNESCO World Heritage Site. In 2004, Lushan Geopark became a member of Global Geoparks Network.

The park is a popular visitor and tourist attraction, and is a cooler summer destination.

See also 
 Mount Lu — World Heritage Site.
 Members of the UNESCO Global Geoparks Network—GGN — Geoparks list.
 National parks of China

External links
 UNESCO World Heritage Site — Lushan National Park
 NationalParkofChina.com: Mount Lu National Park of China
 Global Network of National Geoparks > About GGN > Members list > Lushan Geopark

Global Geoparks Network members
National parks of China
World Heritage Sites in China
Geography of Jiangxi
Tourist attractions in Jiangxi
Geoparks in China